Bernard Aluchna (born 20 August 1937) is a Polish former freestyle swimmer. He competed in two events at the 1960 Summer Olympics.

References

External links
 

1937 births
Living people
Polish male freestyle swimmers
Olympic swimmers of Poland
Swimmers at the 1960 Summer Olympics
Swimmers from Warsaw